Pey Abzar (also Romanized as Pey Ābzār; also known as Pey Ābzā) is a village in Tut-e Nadeh Rural District, in the Central District of Dana County, Kohgiluyeh and Boyer-Ahmad Province, Iran. At the 2006 census, its population was 181, in 38 families.

References 

Populated places in Dana County